Ellen Frankel (born 1951) was the Editor-in-Chief of the Jewish Publication Society (JPS) from 1991 until 2009, and also served as CEO of the JPS for 10 years.  She retired in 2009 to pursue her own writing and scholarly projects, serving as JPS's first Editor Emerita.

Biography
Frankel received her B.A. from the University of Michigan in 1973 and her Ph.D. in Comparative Literature from Princeton University in 1978.

Frankel travels widely as a storyteller and lecturer, speaking to synagogues, summer study institutes, Hillels, Jewish women's groups, JCCs, museums, schools, retirement communities, and radio audiences.  Among the programs she presents are Reading the Torah through a Woman's Eyes; The Evil Eye, Hamsas and Other Jewish Superstitions; Jewish Tales of Love and Romance; Jewish Ethics through Jewish Tales; From Spark to Fire: How Jewish Books Are Born; The History of Jewish Publishing in America; and Writing a Jewish Children's Bible. She also lectures on her work as a librettist of operas and other musical works.

A scholar of Jewish folklore, Frankel has published The Classic Tales: 4000 Years of Jewish Lore, a collection of 300 traditional Jewish tales; and The Encyclopedia of Jewish Symbols, co-authored with artist Betsy Teutsch.  She is also the author of The Five Books of Miriam: A Woman's Commentary on the Torah, published in an Israeli Hebrew edition as Midrash Miriam.  She is the editor of The Jewish Spirit: A Celebration in Stories and Art, and contributing author to the ten-volume series, My People’s Prayerbook.  She is also the author of The Illustrated Hebrew Bible, and the JPS Illustrated Children’s Bible.

Frankel has published two books for young people - Choosing To Be Chosen, a collection of stories for Jewish pre-teens, and a sequel, Tell It Like It Is: Tough Choices for Today’s Teens, which she co-authored with her teenage daughter.

Frankel has also written libretti for two oratorios composed by Andrea Clearfield, Women of Valor and The Golem Psalms.  The first was premiered in Los Angeles in 2002; the second in Philadelphia in 2006.  Her most recent opera, with composer Leonard Lehrman, is "The Triangle Fire," based on the 1911 Triangle Shirtwaist Factory Fire in New York. The opera will premiere at the American Labor Museum on September 4, 2016. She is also developing an opera libretto based on Karel Capek's science fiction classic, R.U.R.

Frankel wrote the libretto for the fact-based opera Slaying the Dragon with music by American composer Michael Ching, based on the book Not by the Sword by Kathryn Watterson. The opera was commissioned by the Center City Opera Theater in Philadelphia, and had its world premiere in June 2012, conducted by Andrew M. Kurtz.

Frankel received the Myrtle Wreath Award from Hadassah in February 2000, the Bernard Reisman Professional Excellence Award from Brandeis University in May 2009 and the National Jewish Book Award in the Illustrated Children's Book category for The JPS Illustrated Children's Bible in 2009.

References

American editors
American women non-fiction writers
Jewish printing and publishing
University of Michigan alumni
Princeton University alumni
Jewish scholars
American musical theatre composers
Women musical theatre composers
Living people
1951 births
American opera librettists
Women opera librettists
American musical theatre librettists
American women chief executives
American publishing chief executives
American storytellers
Women storytellers
20th-century American women writers
20th-century American non-fiction writers
21st-century American women writers
21st-century American non-fiction writers
Oratorio and passion librettists